Carmel is an unincorporated community in Highland County, in the U.S. state of Ohio.

History
A post office was established at Carmel in 1856, and remained in operation until it was discontinued in 1913. The community took its name from the local Mount Carmel church.

References

Unincorporated communities in Highland County, Ohio
Unincorporated communities in Ohio